Malice is the name of six separate fictional supervillains appearing in American comic books published by Marvel Comics. The first two were minions of Killmonger, an enemy of Black Panther. The third was a short-lived Ghost Rider villain. The fourth villain bearing the name Malice was a somewhat alternative personality of Susan Richards of the Fantastic Four. The last two villains bearing the name Malice are disembodied entities, the first of which became an evil doppelganger of Sue Richards who was absorbed into her own mind and the second is a mutant appearing in X-Men comics.

Malice (Black Panther villain)
The first Malice was one of Killmonger's mutated allies during his vie for the throne of Wakanda. Her first appearance was in Jungle Action vol. 2, #8 (Jan 1974). She fought T'Challa, the Black Panther alongside Venomm, Lord Karnaj, Baron Macabre, and others. She was a Wakandan mutate with superhuman strength, speed, and agility and was eventually defeated along with the rest of the villains attempting the coup.

Malice (Nakia)

A second Black Panther-related Malice named Nakia was introduced in Black Panther vol. 3 #1 (Nov. 1998) and was created by Christopher Priest and Mark Texeira.

Malice (Ghost Rider villain)
The second villain to bear the name Malice first appeared in Ghost Rider #25 (Aug. 1977). A showboater by nature, Malice made sure that his emergence was well televised. He burned a wax museum and left a woman to die as well as robbing a bank with his Vault Puller, one of the many devices he used to terrorize the police. While his secret identity is not known, there are suggestions that Malice is a wealthy individual, as he drives an AC Cobra and refers to hiding the money in the woods on his "estate." He was arrested after being defeated by the Ghost Rider using an early predecessor to his penance stare.

Malice, The Mistress of Hate

Malice was a negative aspect of The Invisible Woman's own personality, awakened by the manipulations of the villain Psycho-Man at a time when her emotions were easily susceptible. Sue became pregnant for a second time; however, this pregnancy was even more difficult than the first and Sue eventually lost the child, causing great emotional strain on her. Psycho-Man decided to take advantage of the situation and amplified her negative emotions which resulted in her transformation into Malice, The Mistress of Hate. Malice retained the powers of Susan, but she used them more aggressively, creating explosions and deadly force field spikes. During her first appearance, she was able to use her powers to withstand a direct punch from She-Hulk who was unaware of her identity at the time, and without flinching, She-Hulk did not realize she had just struck a force field. Reed and Johnny only learned who she really was thanks to Daredevil's heightened senses causing him to perceive her as an amorphous blob due to the force field around her. With this revelation, Reed was able to restore her to normal by provoking her into a genuine temper rather than the artificially-created hate she felt due to the Psycho-Man, disrupting the emotional balance that the Psycho-Man's equipment relied on to affect her. The episode would have lasting effects: the Invisible Girl changed her name to Invisible Woman; she discovered how to use force objects and she lost a measure of self-confidence, knowing that Malice still lurked inside her.

During an adventure where Susan and Reed helped the Silver Surfer resuscitate Galactus, Sue came in contact with the Infinity Gems. Distrustful of such power, she fell prey to Malice again. The soul gem tried and failed to combine Reed and Sue's souls, which brought forth the In-Betweener and sent Malice back to Sue's subconscious.

Anthropomorpho Malice
Later during the Infinity War when Adam Warlock's evil persona Magus attempted to conquer the universe, he used the alien species Anthropomorpho to create evil doppelgangers of Earth's heroes, Sue included. In order to subdue Susan the alien took the form of Malice, and Sue was only able to defeat the doppelganger by absorbing her into her own mind and incorporate its evil into herself. That boost allowed the negative aspect of Malice to regain control temporarily.

Eventually, the Invisible Woman's son Franklin Richards expelled Malice from her mind and into his own. Later Sue and Franklin joined their minds to force Malice out of Franklin and into the mind of the Dark Raider, an insane alternate universe counterpart of Mister Fantastic, however the Dark Raider managed to control and negate Malice's influence. Malice was apparently soon destroyed when the Dark Raider died shortly thereafter in the Negative Zone.

The Malice persona was briefly resurrected by the Psycho-Man when he collaborated with the mysterious Quiet Man who had been nurturing a grudge against the Fantastic Four for years. The Quiet Man had a crush on Sue before she met Reed but never had the nerve to talk to her. He hoped to use Malice's ruthlessness to make Susan act uncharacteristically violent in order to encourage judges in court to take her children away. However, Sue eventually overcame the worst of the programming, and the Psycho-Man subsequently removed Malice's influence when Sue threatened to use that anger against him.

Malice (Marauder)

The supervillain Malice was created by Uncanny X-Men writer Chris Claremont. She is a member of Mister Sinister's Marauders. Being incorporeal, she has no physical body of her own and has to possess the body of others. Those she possesses manifest a cameo-like choker around their neck. It is implied that the choker is a vessel for Malice's psychic energy form and destroying the choker can disperse her energy form for a short period of time. Malice body hops through a number of X-Men, including Dazzler, Wolverine, Rogue and Storm. Storm's will is too strong, and she forcibly ejects Malice from her body. After possessing Polaris, she singlehandedly defeats all her Marauders teammates, earning her a place as the field leader of the Marauders. A side effect occurs that Malice did not expect; Malice's and Polaris' energy matrices interweave and the two women become permanently bonded together. Mr. Sinister had known this union would occur, but did not warn Malice of it because he had wanted to use it to ensure Polaris would remain his prisoner/slave.

After Mister Sinister is seemingly killed by Cyclops, Malice's hold over Polaris weakens. Polaris' alleged half-sister Zaladane, a priestess for the Savage Land's Sun People, uses the High Evolutionary's machinery to strip Polaris of her magnetic powers and take them as her own; the process also finally separates Polaris and Malice.

Malice resurfaces years later to bother Polaris once more. She possesses Havok and tries to kill Polaris so she can get her revenge against Sinister, from whom she was trying to break free. In the end, Sinister asks Malice to possess Polaris once again, knowing that Lorna would not object to the possession in order to save Havok. However, out of their love for each other, Havok and Polaris each try to absorb Malice, preventing the other from being possessed. Malice is then apparently destroyed by Sinister himself. Later Scalphunter and Arclight explain to an imprisoned Threnody, a former ally of Mister Sinister who tried to escape him, that no one has ever escaped from Mister Sinister. They remind her about how Mister Sinister killed Malice.

Malice later returns as a digital entity instead of a psionic one, taking possession of Karima Shapandar (Omega Sentinel) by a computer virus via e-mail. Emma Frost soon becomes aware of another being within Omega Sentinel but is nevertheless taken by surprise when Malice attacks and sedates her. The other X-Men continue to be unaware of Malice possessing Karima until they are attacked by her and the rest of the new Marauders. Later, she fights alongside the other Marauders in Flint, Michigan, against Iceman and Cannonball, as both sides try to obtain the Diaries of Destiny.

In X-Men: Messiah Complex, Malice travels to Cooperstown, Alaska along with fellow Marauders Sunfire, Gambit, Prism, Blockbuster, Lady Mastermind, and Scalphunter. They try to find the baby but instead come across a small army of Purifiers and they come to blows, devastating the town. 

The next time she is seen, the five member assault task force of X-Men invades the Marauders base, and is forced to fight Colossus along with Arclight, Frenzy, and Unuscione. She then teams up with Lady Mastermind in taking out Wolverine by throwing an unconscious Scrambler disguised as Angel at him. After he realizes the deception, she hits him with a powerful microwave energy blast. Nightcrawler teleports in and knocks her out along with Lady Mastermind.

A squad consisting of Malice, Gambit, Sunfire, and Vertigo confront Bishop who is about to kill the baby. The Marauder team defeat Bishop and Malice seems to show a lot of affection towards the baby and finds it extraordinary that the baby girl isn't scared at all when she picks her up. 

During the final battle on Muir Island, Malice along with all of Sinister's army excluding Gambit and Mystique ambush X-Force. When X-Force is soon joined by the X-Men, Predator X, and the New X-Men, Cyclops allows the New X-Men to tackle the Marauders. Malice is skeptical when it comes to fighting children but is unpleasantly surprised with the tenacity of the youngsters. She goes on to battle Pixie, beating her with her bare fists, until Pixie fights back and guts Malice with her Souldagger. It appears that the dagger exorcises Malice from Omega Sentinel, but Karima has no memory of the events that took place in the last two and a half weeks, apparently a side effect of being possessed by Malice.

Malice has since made her presence known in New York where she starts to possess people until Cyclops is able to detect her (possible with the help of Cerebra). While tracking her on a subway train he runs into a fight with the Superior Spider-Man. Malice possesses Cyclops for a few seconds before she is knocked unconscious by the Superior Spider-Man. He takes the possessed Cyclops to his lab and separates Malice from him, putting her in a containment box that he gives to Cyclops.

How she escaped from the containment box is unknown, but she reappeared in a new body and rejoined the Marauders, who once again began massacring the Morlock population. This lead an angered Chamber, their new leader, to rejoin the X-Men. When the X-Men re-encountered the Morlocks, the Marauders fought briefly, but ultimately surrendered, professing their innocence. Not believing them, Chamber burned them to death with his psionic flame.

Malice reappeared again during Reign of X, when it was revealed that she had taken control over the mindless body of Elizabeth Braddock (Psylockes/Captain Britain) while her teammates in the most recent incarnation of Excalibur sought to restore her mind to her body. Upon doing so, Elizabeth was able to force Malice from her body with help from Kwannon, literally vomiting Malice's chocker form out of her mouth. Malice then tried to possess Rogue but failed, then fled into Krakoa, much to the horror of the team.

Arriving at Krakoa, she went on to possess Emma Frost and attack Betsy, but was defeated by Kwannon. Both Betsy and Kwannon tried to get Malice to stop attacking people but Malice only wanted to die. As it turns out, Malice's true name is Alice MacAllister and she was 16 when her mutant power manifested during an argument with her mother. When she wished herself to be dead, Alice found herself becoming a psionic entity as her mortal body expired and departed her childhood house.

During the conflict with Betsy and Kwannon, Malice gets killed. However, she was then resurrected by the Five with a body of her own. She was granted mercy and given a fresh chance at life.

Other versions
In the alternate reality depicted in What If? vol. 2 #74 (June 1995), a version of Malice appears, possessing Madelyne Pryor (a clone of Jean Grey) as a member of Mister Sinister's X-Men. She appears in the form of a neck choker.

In the possible future that depicted X-Men: The End, the Malice choker was in possession of the renegade Sage. Obsessed with learning all things possible, she used Malice to datamine as many people as possible and then acquire the knowledge Malice gathered. Some of the X-Men were sent after Sage, but the hyper-intelligent mutant was ready for them and laid a trap. She managed to clip the choker around X-23's neck and Malice briefly possessed her, acquiring all the knowledge of the girl. Sage was caught soon after though and Malice was taken off her, putting a stop to her plans.

In the reality depicted in X-Men Forever, Malice was used to take control over the alien Hepzibah. The Marauders were sent after the young Nate Grey and Hepzibah was used as a vessel to get close to the child. Lockheed figured out she was possessed and attacked her, alerting Polaris, who recognized Malice's trademark choker. Polaris ripped the choker off Hepzibah and left it lying on the ground, where it was picked up by Mystique.

An alternate version of Malice appeared in league with the New Marauders, a team displaced from their native universe (Earth-1610) and assembled by Miss Sinister; this version of Malice exists in the form of a necklace instead of a choker; it was in the possession of the time displaced version of Jean Grey and was abandoned when Grey and the rest of her team went to space to rescue Cyclops' father. When Polaris found the necklace, Malice was able to possess her and used Polaris to attack the Raksha, a group of local vigilantes that were visiting the X-Mansion, but because Polaris had already fallen victim by the prime version of Malice, she was eventually able to snap out of her control and broke free which destroyed the necklace, and seemingly killing the entity in the process.

In other media

Television
 Susan Richards appears as Malice in the Fantastic Four episode "Worlds Within Worlds". This version's appearance is the result of Psycho-Man using his powers to make Susan turn against her Fantastic Four teammates. Eventually however, Susan is freed of Psycho-Man's influence and defeats him.

References

External links
 Malice's Profile at Women of Marvel Comics 
 

Characters created by Chris Claremont
Comics characters introduced in 1974
Comics characters introduced in 1977
Comics characters introduced in 1987
Marvel Comics female supervillains
Marvel Comics mutants
Wakandans